The 51-episode anime series Digimon Tamers, produced by Toei Animation in 2001, is the third series in the Digimon franchise. It does not follow the plot of the previous two series, Adventure and Adventure 02. Instead, the story is set in a version of the real world where Digimon are creatures in a collectible card game; however, several children discover that these supposedly fictional creatures exist in a parallel Digital World and are attempting to enter the real world. The series was directed by Yukio Kaizawa and written by Chiaki J. Konaka, featuring music composition by Takanori Arisawa and character designs by Katsuyoshi Nakatsuru. Tamers aired in Japan on Fuji TV between April 1, 2001, and March 31, 2002.
In the United States, the series aired on Fox Kids from September 1, 2001 to June 8, 2002. In Canada, the series broadcast on YTV in the same year. The series has also aired in Asia and Europe. Following the discontinuation of the Fox Kids programming block, it aired on ABC Family, Toon Disney, and Disney XD.

Kōji Wada's song "The Biggest Dreamer" was used as the opening theme for the series. The English opening sees a revamped version of the theme song from Digimon Adventure & Adventure 02 by Paul Gordon and it was the last one in the series to do so.

The third season of Digimon: Digital Monsters (aka Digimon Tamers) was licensed by Saban Entertainment in North America and other English-speaking territories, and was distributed by BVS Entertainment and Buena Vista Television. The show initially aired on Fox Kids, before distribution rights were held by Disney, later airing on Toon Disney and ABC Family.

This is also the last season of Digimon: Digital Monsters to be dubbed by Saban Entertainment and to be aired on Fox Kids, when The Walt Disney Company acquired the Fox Family Worldwide franchise of libraries and assets in 2001.


Episode list

Volume DVDs

Japanese release
Toei Video, the distribution arm of Toei Animation, released a total of 12 DVD compilations of Digimon Tamers in Japan between January 21 and December 6, 2002. The series was also released as a 9-disc boxed set on April 25, 2007, by Happinet Pictures.

North American release
New Video Group released a 'complete edition' of the season (for the very first time) on DVD on June 11, 2013. Similar to past releases, the collection is English-dubbed (only) 8-disc set.

See also

References

External links
Digimon Tamers official website 

Digimon Tamers
2001 Japanese television seasons
2002 Japanese television seasons
Tamers